CW 56 may refer to:

WLVI in Boston, Massachusetts
WOLF-TV in Scranton, Pennsylvania